Pharen I of Armenia was the 17th Catholicos-Patriarch  of the Armenian Apostolic Church. 

He started his reign of Catholicoi after the death of Daniel I of Armenia, in which, he succeeded him in c. 348. He reigned for 5 years until his death on c. 352 and was succeeded by  St. Nerses I the Great.  

Catholicoi of Armenia